Lamkin Golf Grips was founded in Chicago, Illinois by Elver B. Lamkin in 1925.

Lamkin Golf Grips is currently run by the third generation of Lamkins, Robert J. Lamkin, who became the president and CEO in 2001. They also sponsor the Lamkin Grips San Diego Classic which has hosted by San Diego State each March since 2007.

In 2004, Lamkin announced plans to raise $1m to help fund the battle against Prostate cancer, as a sponsor of the Prostate Cancer Foundation. As of 2008, they had raised more than $400,000 for this cause.

References

External links
  (US)
  (UK)

American companies established in 1925
Companies based in Chicago
Golf equipment manufacturers
Golf in the United States
Manufacturing companies based in Chicago
Manufacturing companies established in 1925
Sporting goods manufacturers of the United States